Landwehr is the German word for a type of national home guard or territorial army. It may also refer to:

Geography
 Landwehr, Lower Saxony, Germany, a municipality
 Landwehr (Golßen), a village in the borough of Golßen, Brandenburg, Germany
 , a farmstead in the borough of Halver, North Rhine-Westphalia, Germany
 , a village in the borough of Menden, Sauerland, Germany
 Landwehr (Quarnbek), a village in the municipality of Quarnbek in Schleswig-Holstein, Germany
 , part of Radevormwald in North Rhine-Westphalia, Germany
 Landwehr, until 1938 Geswethen, a county of Insterburg, East Prussia, since 1946: Nagornoje, a settlement in Chernyakhovsky District, Kaliningrad Oblast, Russia
 Kirchwehrener Landwehr, a stream in Hanover Region, Germany
 , a woodland in Wachau, Saxony near Radeberg, Saxony, Germany

Fortifications and borders
 Landwehr (border), a medieval border demarcation or fortified border around a settlement or territory in Europe
 , a series of fortifications around the Kahler Asten in the county of Hochsauerlandkreis, Germany

People
 Landwehr (surname)